ARTIS International is a scientific research organization that focuses on behavioral dynamics affecting conflict. Its work is field orientated, and the fellows come from a wide variety of disciplines.

The company has a significant focus on the limits of rational choice or utilitarian thinking in decision making. This can be seen in numerous publications including: "Religious and Sacred Imperatives in Human Conflict"
","Sacred Bounds on Rational Resolution of Violent Political Conflict", "The Devoted Actor's Will to Fight and the Spiritual Dimension of Human Conflict", "Challenges Researching Terrorism from the Field"

ARTIS International was founded in 2006 by Scott Atran, Richard Davis, and Marc Sageman.

ARTIS International collaborates with a variety of partners including The Minerva Research Initiative, Carnegie Corporation of New York, The Center for the Resolution of Intractable Conflict at The University of Oxford , The United Nations Counter-Terrorism Executive Directorate, and The Templeton Foundation.

The Devoted Actor ® Model 
ARTIS fellows have long looked at the behavioral dimensions of conflict, focusing on sacred values and identity fusion. ARTIS has trademarked The Devoted Actor Model as a way to model human behavior which fundamentally diverges from rational, utilitarian behavior and can lead people to pursue violence. Most notably, the company published an article in the journal Nature Human Behaviour in August 2017 titled 'The Devoted Actor's Will to Fight and the Spiritual Dimension of Human Conflict'. This seminal work has resulted in features in multiple major news outlets including in CNN on Motivations driving fighters in The Levant, in The Guardian Why people die for a cause, and The Telegraph Where the mind is without fear.

Fellows 
Senior Fellows include renowned political scientist Dr. Robert Axelrod (Walgreen Professor for the Study of Human Understanding at the University of Michigan and National Medal of Science winner), Richard Garwin (Presidential Medal of Freedom honoree), Dr. Baruch Fischhoff (Howard Heinz University Professor in the Institute for Politics and Strategy at Carnegie Mellon and member of the National Academy of Sciences), Dr. Douglas Medin (Louis W. Menk Professor of Psychology at Northwestern University and member of the National Academy of Sciences), Dr. Richard Nisbett (Theodore M. Newcomb Distinguished Professor of social psychology and co-director of the Culture and Cognition program at the University of Michigan and member of the National Academy of Sciences),  the Honorable Lord John Alderdice (senior negotiator for the Good Friday Agreements and the first speaker of the Northern Ireland Assembly and former President of Liberal International), Juan Zarate (Former Deputy National Security Advisor for Combating Terrorism), General (Ret.) Douglas M. Stone (Former Deputy Commanding Officer, MNF-Iraq), Captain (Ret.) Benjamin Runkle (former Senior Advisor on the National Security Council), Dr. Richard Davis (Chairman, Permanent Monitoring Panel on Terrorism, World Federation of Scientists), and Scott Atran (Research Director in Anthropology at France’s National Center for Scientific Research) .

General Publications 
While using academic publications as a bedrock of the ARTIS research, fellows also frequently publish findings to more general audiences in major publications. Notable publications which have been driven through ARTIS International research include Terrorism: The Lessons of Barcelona, Paris: The War ISIS Wants, What Makes a Terrorist, How Spain Misunderstood the Catalan Independence Movement, Mindless Terrorists? The Truth about ISIS is Much Worse, ISIS After the Caliphate, ISIS: The Durability of Chaos, Why We Talk to Terrorists, and Give Palestine's Unity Government a Chance.

References 

2006 establishments in Arizona
Companies based in Scottsdale, Arizona
Research organizations in the United States